Macaná may refer to:

Places
Macaná, Guayanilla, Puerto Rico, a barrio
Macaná, Peñuelas, Puerto Rico, a barrio